Grey Damon (born September 24, 1987) is an American actor, known for his roles in Friday Night Lights, The Nine Lives of Chloe King and Station 19. He resides in Los Angeles.  Beginning with its premiere on May 28, 2015, Damon co-starred with David Duchovny on the NBC series Aquarius.

Early life
Damon was born in Bloomington, Indiana. When Damon was young, he was raised in Boulder, Colorado. He discovered his passion for acting at the Denver Center for the Performing Arts when he landed his first professional job in a production of A Christmas Carol.

Career
He made his acting debut in the February 3, 2009 episode of The CW's 90210, before getting minor roles in other television series such as Greek and 10 Things I Hate About You, and a recurring role in True Blood. In 2010, he landed a regular role as Hastings Ruckle in the final season of Friday Night Lights. The following year, he starred as Brian in The Nine Lives of Chloe King, which was cancelled after one season, and in 2012, he appeared in a recurring role in The Secret Circle. Damon had a recurring role as Archie in Freeform's Twisted.

Damon played the main love interest of Destinee & Paris in their 2011 music video for "True Love". On February 25, 2013, he was cast as Grayson in The CW's drama series Star-Crossed (originally titled Oxygen). In early August 2013, it was reported that Damon would join the cast for American Horror Story: Coven. In 2016, Damon was announced as Mirror Master for The Flash season 3. He was later cast in the spinoff of Grey's Anatomy called Station 19 as Jack Gibson.

Filmography

Film

Television

Music videos

References

External links
 

1987 births
21st-century American male actors
American male film actors
American male television actors
Living people
Male actors from Indiana
Male actors from Los Angeles
People from Bloomington, Indiana